Hyderabadi Muslims are an ethnoreligious community of Urdu-speaking Muslims, part of a larger group of Dakhini Muslims, from the area that used to be the princely state of Hyderabad, India, including cities like Hyderabad, Aurangabad and Bidar.

First generation immigrants are not included, however second and third generation immigrants who have adopted Hyderabadi Muslim Culture are usually considered Hyderabadi Muslims and included in the list.

Literature

Mirza Farhatullah Baig (1883–1947), Urdu writer
Sayyid Shamsullah Qadri (1885–1953), Urdu scholar, writer, historian and archaeologist
Amjad Hyderabadi (1878–1961), Urdu poet of Ruba'i
Ahmed Abdullah Masdoosi (1905–1968), Pakistani poet
Mohiuddin Qadri Zore (1905–1962), Urdu poet, literary critic and historian, established Idare Adabiyaat-e-Urdu in Hyderabad
Makhdoom Mohiuddin (1908–1969), Urdu poet and Marxist politician
Sayyid Ahmedullah Qadri (1909–1985), Urdu writer, critic, author and politician; President of Lutfuddaulah Oriental Research Institute, Hyderabad
Sulaiman Areeb (b. 1922), Urdu poet
Khamakha Hyderabadi (1929–2017), Urdu poet and humorist
Fatima Surayya Bajia (1930–2016), Pakistani Urdu novelist and playwright
Aziz Qaisi (1931–1992), Urdu poet, short story writer, and film writer
Bilkees I. Latif (1931–2017), authored four books
Awaz Sayeed (1934–1995), Urdu writer of short stories and biographer
Mujataba Hussain (b. 1936), Urdu satirist and humorist; Padma Shri recipient
Razaul Jabbar (1937–2011), Indo-Canadian author of many books, settled in Canada
Anwar Maqsood (b. 1940), Pakistani script writer, anchorperson, show host
Masood Ali Khan (b. 1947), authored Islamic and cultural encyclopedia
Omar Khalidi (1952–2010), authored Hyderabad: After the Fall; migrated to US
M. A. Muqtedar Khan (b. 1966), political science professor, Islamic philosopher and Muslim intellectual
Abid Hasan (d. 1986), translated Tagore's Jana Gana Mana into Subh Sukh Chain
Haroon Siddiqui, Indo-Canadian journalist
Samina Ali, PEN/Hemingway Award winner for her novel Madras on Rainy Days

Religious scholars
Inayat Khan (1882–1927), founder of the Sufi Order in the West
Abul Ala Maududi (1903–1979), Pakistani philosopher, founder of the Jamaat-e-Islami
Muhammad Hamidullah (1908–2002), professor, translator of Quran into French, authored over a hundred books.
 M. A. Muqtedar Khan (b. 1966), reformist Islamic thinker and strong advocate of Ijtihad
Hameeduddin Aqil, founder of the Darul Uloom Hyderabad
 Rasheed Turabi, Islamic scholar
 Muhammad Muslehuddin Siddiqui, Islamic scholar, migrated to Pakistan
 Hashim Amir Ali, Islamic scholar and translator of the Quran in English under the title The Message of the Quran – presented in perspective (1974)
 Sayyid Shamsullah Qadri

Arts
 Inayat Khan (1882–1927), Indian classical musician and Sufi leader.
 Bade Ghulam Ali Khan (1902-1968).  Hindustani classical musician and vocalist.
 Munshi Raziuddin (1912–2003), Pakistani qawwali musician; used to perform in the court of the Nizam
 Ajit Khan (1922–1998), Bollywood actor
 Nigar Sultana (actress) (1932-2000) Bollywood actress 
 Sana Javed, Pakistani television actress
 Sharmila Tagore (1944-till date) Bollywood actress  
 Shabana Azmi (1950-till date) Bollywood actress 
 Mumtaz (actress) (1947-till date) Bollywood actress 
 Shahrukh Khan (b. 1965), Bollywood actor (half Hyderabadi)
 Kabir Khan (director) is an Indian film director, screenwriter and cinematographer.
 Razak Khan 1951-2016) Bollywood actor
 Mahmood Ali (1928–2008), Pakistani television and radio artist
 Fatima Surayya Bajia (1930–2016), Pakistani Urdu novelist, playwright and drama writer
 Irshad Panjatan (b. 1931), actor and mime artist
 Aziz Qaisi (1931–1992), Urdu poet, short story writer, and film writer
 Ahmed Rushdi (1934–1983), Pakistani playback singer
 Bahauddin Khan (1934-2006), Pakistani qawwali musician; used to perform in the court of the Nizam
 Anwar Maqsood (b. 1940), Pakistani playwright and satirist
 Zubaida Tariq (1945–2018), Pakistani chef and cooking expert
 Talat Aziz (b. 1965), Ghazal singer
 Tabu (b. 1971), Bollywood actress; Padma Shri recipient
 Dia Mirza (b.1981) Bollywood actress and Miss India 2000
 Waheeda Rehman (b.1938). Bollywood actress and classical dancer. Earned the Padma Bhushan recipient.
 Aditi Rao Hydari Bollywood actress
 Ateeq Hussain Khan (b. 1980), qawwali musician
 Aziz Naser (b. 1980), actor and film director
 Mohammad Irfan Ali, singer and winner of Jo Jeeta Wohi Super Star
 Warsi Brothers, qawwali musicians
 Mohammad Ali Baig, theater personality and ad film maker; Padma Shri recipient
 Mast Ali, Indian actor

Academics
 Mohammed Vizarat Rasool Khan  (1946–2013), founder of Shadan Group of Institutions
Ali Yavar Jung (1906–1976), served as Vice-chancellor of the Osmania University as well as the Aligarh Muslim University
 Muhammad Zia ud-Din, serving as the Vice-chancellor of Federal Urdu University, having an Urdu-speaking background of Alid Arab-Hyderabadi origins.

Scientists
 Raziuddin Siddiqui (1908–1998), theoretical physicist; member of imperial Britain's nuclear physicist delegation; participated in nuclear weapons programs of the US (Manhattan Project) and UK (Tube Alloys Project)
Saleh Muhammad Aladdin, astronomer
 Ahmed Mohiuddin (1923–1998), founder of the Pakistan Zoological Society, authored 37 books on scientific research

Politics
Maulvi Allauddin (1824–1889), revolutionary and Indian Independence activist
Turrebaz Khan (?–1859), revolutionary and Indian Independence activist
Sir Akbar Hydari (1869–1941), former Prime Minister of Hyderabad
Mehdi Nawaz Jung (1894–1967), former governor of Gujarat
Sir Muhammad Saleh Akbar Hydari (1894–1948), former Governor of Assam
Akbar Ali Khan (1899–1994), former Governor of Uttar Pradesh and Governor of Orissa
 Ali Yavar Jung (1906–1976), former Governor of Maharashtra
Makhdoom Mohiuddin (1908–1969), communist activist of the Telangana Rebellion
 Sayyid Ahmedullah Qadri (1909–1985), Indian independence activist
 Idris Hasan Latif (1923–2018), former Governor of Maharashta
 Sultan Salahuddin Owaisi (1931–2008), served six terms as Member of Parliament; former AIMIM President
 Asaduddin Owaisi (b. 1969), President Of AIMIM and Member of Parliament
Akbaruddin Owaisi (b. 1970), MLA from Chandrayangutta constituency
 Suhail A. Khan, American conservative political activist
 Bahadur Yar Jung, prominent figure of the Pakistan movement
 Mir Laiq Ali, last Prime Minister of Hyderabad State
 Hassan Nasir, Pakistani communist activist
 Mohammad Majid Hussain, former Mayor of Hyderabad
 Syed Ahmed Pasha Quadri, politician
 Shabbir Ali, Minister during Indian National Congress rule in AP

Military services
Syed Ahmed El Edroos (1899–1962), veteran of both World Wars; last commander-in-chief of the Hyderabad State Army
Captain Mateen Ansari (1916–1943), British Indian Army officer; graduate of Indian Military Academy; served in the British Indian Army as a part of the 5th Battalion, 7th Rajput Regiment in World War II; posthumous recipient of the George Cross
Syed Mohammad Ahsan (1920–1989), admiral and former Chief of Naval Staff, Pakistan Navy; weapon engineer officer for Royal Naval Engineers, United Kingdom during the Second World War; recipient of the United Kingdom's Distinguished Service Order military medal
Idris Hasan Latif (1923–2018), former Chief of Air Staff, Indian Air Force
Mohammad Ahmed Zaki (b. 1935), former lieutenant general and director general of the Indian Army Infantry
Jameel Mahmood (1938–1997), commander-in-chief (GOC-in-C), Eastern Command of the Indian Army
 Hashim Ali Khan, commandant of the 2nd Lancers, Hyderabad Imperial Service Troops
 Shahid Karimullah, admiral and former four-star naval officer; Chief of Naval Staff (CNS), Pakistan Navy, 2002–2005; graduate of the United States Naval War College; recipient of the United States military Legion of Merit medal and French military Légion d'honneur (Legion of Honour) medal; former senior officer of the Pakistan Navy Elite Special Service Group (Navy), SSGN commando division
 Sultan Mehmood, former major general of the Indian Army
 Sami Khan, former lieutenant general of the Indian Army; former Commandant of Indian National Defence Academy
Abid Hasan (d. 1984), major in the Azad Hind Fauj

Administrators, Civil Servants and Diplomats
Ali Yavar Jung (1906–1976), served as the Indian ambassador to Argentina (1952–54), Egypt (1954–58), Yugoslavia and Greece (1958–61), France (1961–65), and the United States (1968–70)
Abid Hasan (1911–1984), served as India's Ambassador to Denmark
Abid Hussain (1926–2012), IAS; served as India's Ambassador to the United States from 1990 to 1992.
Shirin R. Tahir-Kheli, former Director of Political Military Affairs, United States National Security Council, US; former research professor at Johns Hopkins University Foreign Policy Institute at the Paul H. Nitze School of Advanced International Studies, in Washington DC, US
 Sohail Mohammed, New Jersey Superior Court Judge, 2011
 Abdul Razack, Judicial Member Income Tax Appellate Tribunal, Government of India (1992–2003)

Sports

Cricket
 Syed Mohammed Hadi (1899–1971), first class cricketer
Ghulam Qureshi (1918–1994), first class cricketer
 Ghulam Ahmed (1922–1998), former test captain of the Indian Cricket Team
 Abbas Ali Baig (b. 1939), played 10 tests
Murtuza Baig (b. 1941), first class cricketer
 Asif Iqbal (b. 1943), cricketer, former captain of the Pakistan cricket team
 Arshad Ayub  (b. 1958), played 13 tests and 32 ODIs
 Mohammad Azharuddin (b. 1963), former captain of the Indian Cricket Team; Padma Shri recipient
 Syed Ahmed Quadri (b. 1981), first class cricketer
Samad Fallah (b. 1985), first class cricketer
 Mohammed Siraj
 Waheed Yar Khan

Football
 Syed Abdul Rahim (1909–1963), former Head Coach of India national football team
 Syed Shahid Hakim (b. 1939), represented India at the 1960 Summer Olympics
 Syed Nayeemuddin (b. 1944), former captain of the Indian football team
 Shabbir Ali (b. 1956), recipient of India's highest award for lifetime achievement in sports, the Dhyan Chand Award
 Yousuf Khan (1937–2006), represented India at the 1960 Summer Olympics

Tennis
 Syed Mohammed Hadi (1899–1971), represented British India at the 1924 Summer Olympics
 Syed Asif Quadri (b. 1936)
 Sania Mirza (b. 1986), former World No.1 and winner of six Grand Slam titles
 Khanum Haji

Other sports
 Mir Mohtesham Ali Khan, bodybuilding
 S. M. Arif (b. 1944), badminton
 Abdul Najeeb Qureshi (b. 1988), sprint
 Syed Mohammed Hadi, hockey
 Abdul Basith, volleyball

Engineering 
 Ali Nawaz Jung, former Chief Engineer of Hyderabad State

Social work
 Amina Hydari (1878–1939), known for her work during the Great Musi Flood
Bilkees I. Latif (1931–2017), known for her work in the slums of Mumbai; Padma Shri recipient
Zehra Ali Yavar Jung, founder of Society For Clean Cities (SCC); Padma Bhushan recipient
Ashraf Un Nisa Begum, responsible of saving multiple lives during a fire; only Indian woman recipient of George Cross
 Khalida Parveen Well known for social and Human Right activist and woman social leader, President Amoomat Society, Hyderabad

Asaf Jahi dynasty

Nizams of Hyderabad
 Asaf Jah I
 Asaf Jah II
 Asaf Jah III
 Asaf Jah IV
 Asaf Jah V
 Asaf Jah VI
 Asaf Jah VII

Descendants of Asaf Jah VII
 Azam Jah
 Moazzam Jah
 Mukarram Jah
 Muffakham Jah
 Azmet Jah
 Mir Najaf Ali Khan

See also

 Hyderabadi Muslims

References

Hyderabadi Muslim
Muslims
Hyderabad